Mary Elizabeth Walton was a nineteenth-century  American inventor who was awarded two patents for pollution-reducing devices. In 1881, Walton created a method for reducing the environmental hazards of the smoke emitted from locomotive, industrial and residential chimneys. Her system deflected the emissions being produced by factory smokestacks into water tanks, where the pollutants were retained and later flushed "into the sewer, or into other suitable channels for conducting them to a distant or any desired locality". This water tank system redirected smoke, odors, and pollutants away from the city and out of the air before society had even come to an understanding of the problem. The extent of the problem was a dark cloud that hung in the air and an unpleasant odor, yet Walton inadvertently also helped to reduce air pollution and cancer-causing coal smoke.

Mary Walton also invented a system for reducing the noise produced by the elevated railway systems that were rapidly expanding in New York City, where she lived near the Sixth Avenue Line. Walton had chosen to pursue a solution after hearing that young Thomas Edison had tried and failed. After experimentation and research, she was able to narrow down that much of the sound was a result of amplification from wooden support boxes. To test various solutions, she built a model of the tracks in her basement. From these tests, she determined that lining the boxes with cotton and filling them with sand served to effectively dampen the sound of the trains. Her system deadened the noise caused by trains running over the tracks by cradling the tracks in a wooden box lined with cotton and filled with sand. The rights to her invention, patented in 1881, were sold to the Metropolitan Railroad for $10,000 and the system was soon adopted by other elevated railway companies. Her idea of using sand to dampen sound pollution in New York was inspired by the use of sand to dampen the clanging of anvils near her home. Mary Walton was a true innovator, noticing and experiencing problems in her life and targeting that as a way to make the world a better place.

Early life 
There is little documentation of Mary Walton’s life. As a woman inventor, she was woefully overlooked as a person and she is a bit of an enigma in how she was capable of creating two beneficial inventions as a woman in the 1880s. However, a statement made in 1884 and published in the Weekly Transcript of Lexington, Kentucky, provides some crucial information about her youth. Walton is quoted as saying, “My father had no sons, and believed in educating his daughters. He spared no pains or expense to this end". Still, while this provides some insight to her youth, there is no record of her having received a formal education, much less one focused on environmental engineering. The culture and time period made it a challenge for a woman to receive any education; it would seem impossible that she received a specialized education in a STEM field.

Innovations 
The Industrial Revolution, which began in the late 1860s after the Civil War, drove workers and immigrants to cities like New York in search of industrial jobs. Smokestacks billowed heavy plumes of smoke into the air, while factory jobs improved livelihoods. Aside from manufacturing pollution, new elevated trains that transported employees into and out of cities produced loud noise and emitted poisonous smoke along the rails. Mary Walton ran a boarding house in New York City in 1879, which was right across from the elevated train. Walton decided to handle the problems herself, disgusted by the dark smoke and roar of the railway engines.

Walton's invention (patent #221,880) diverted smokestack pollutants into water tanks, where they were kept until they were discharged into the city's sewage system. Walton went on to address the rattling and clanging noises from the elevated trains a few years later. New York City even enlisted the help of America's most famous inventors, including Thomas Edison, to find a solution. However, it was not renowned inventor Thomas Edison that was able to solve the problem. Mary Walton, a woman in the working class, experienced the effects of this problem daily as she lived alongside tracks. Her boarding house at 6th Avenue and 12th Street was against the city’s new Gilbert Elevated Railway. Innovation is problem solving, and Walton experienced the pain point to a greater extent than Edison, likely contributing to her insistence to generate a solution. 

Walton realized after several days of riding the trains that the tracks enhanced the train's noise due to the basic timber supports they went through. In her basement, Walton set up a miniature railroad track and discovered an outstanding sound-dampening device. She cradled the rails in a box-like framework of wood that was tar-painted, cotton-lined, and sand-filled. The sound was absorbed by the surrounding materials as the vibrations from the rails were absorbed.

Walton got patent #237,422 on February 8, 1881, after successful trials. She sold the rights to the Metropolitan Railroad of Innovative York City for $10,000 and the system was soon adopted by other elevated railway companies, which thrived as a result of Walton's new, environmentally friendly system.

Legacy 
Walton’s technology and engineering advances solved a very real problem. After its adoption in New York, Walton traveled to England to promote her pollution deterrent and noise blocker, as she was aware of the dark cloud that hung over London throughout their Industrial Revolution. Walton’s invention was hailed by British officials to be one of the greatest inventions of the age. 

Walton’s invention was primarily focused on elevated railways, which have almost all been phased out and replaced by underground rails, a trend that began in the 1930s. One example of such replacement is in New York, the very city that both inspired and implemented Walton’s innovation. Evidence of this old railway system can be found along New York’s Highline, an area that has now been transformed into a green space in the city. However, there are still some elevated railways in Chicago, and Walton’s technology has been adopted both domestically and internationally, meaning that while it’s not to the same extent it was in her lifetime, remnants of her patented solutions to pollution and noise still exist today.

Understanding of the issues of air pollution and constant noise on the environment and the human body has grown significantly today, revealing the inadvertent positive impacts that Walton had on her society. Significant amounts of air pollution have been found to cause cancer, and the water tank redirection system that Walton devised helped to improve air quality. And while the noise of the railcars was surely disruptive for the day to day life of New Yorkers, having noise that is either too loud or too persistent can cause physical complications such as an increased risk of hearing loss, stress, anxiety, depression, high blood pressure, and heart disease. Mary Walton helped to address these problems, before even understanding them fully. 

Walton is hailed as a STEM feminist and role model. "The most noted machinists and inventors of the century [Thomas Edison among them] had given their attention to the subject without being able to provide a solution, when, lo, a woman's brain did the work..." the Woman's Journal wrote twenty years later. However, when prompted to think of an inventor, or even a woman inventor, Mary Walton’s name is not mentioned enough. She was ahead of her time in engineering ability, in gender roles, and in air quality and pollution prevention, and she still has yet to receive the attention she so rightfully deserves.

References

External links 
Mary Walton Profile on ENGINEERING.com

American inventors
Women inventors
Year of death missing
Year of birth missing